Lycée la Providence is a private Catholic lycée, collège and technical college, located in Amiens, Hauts-de-France, in the Somme department of France. Founded and run by the Society of Jesus, the facility offers education from kindergarten through professional and technological training.

Programs 
Current language exchange programs include the countries of Germany, England, Peru, China, Italy, and Netherlands. Intramural sports include rugby, basketball, football, swimming, water polo, gymnastics, badminton, handball, futsal, bodybuilding, and table tennis. Interscholastic sports competition in a given year has produced championships most notably in swimming, water polo, handball, and judo. 

Boarding facilities accommodate 460 girls and boys, from sixth standard through post-baccalaureate. Besides the swimming pool there is a  park around the facility. 

Solidarity with the poor and disadvantaged are instilled through various Pastoral Department programs throughout the year. The school has an elaborate scholarship program for those in need. Parents are encouraged to be a part of the French L'A.P.E.L movement for the promotion of their values as parents.

Notable alumni

 Jean-Paul Delevoye, former delegate minister in charge of the pension reform in the second Philippe government
 Laurent Delahousse, journalist and TV presenter
 Fabrice Éboué, French humorist and actor
 Olivier Guéant, French mathematician
 Philippe Leclerc de Hauteclocque, French general during WW2 and Marshal of France
 Frédérique Macarez, politician.
 Emmanuel Macron, President of France
 François Ruffin, French journalist and politician
 Jón Sveinsson, Icelandic Jesuit Priest and author of the "Nonni" books series

Notable former staff
 Brigitte Trogneux, former teacher and wife of Emmanuel Macron

See also

 Catholic Church in France
 Education in France
 List of Jesuit schools

References

External links
 Official website

Jesuit secondary schools in France
Buildings and structures in Amiens
Providence
Jesuit elementary and primary schools in France
Education in Amiens
Vocational education in France